Gallier House is a restored 19th-century historic house museum located on Royal Street in the French Quarter of New Orleans, Louisiana.

It was originally the home of prominent New Orleans architect, James Gallier Jr. Construction began in 1857 and he moved in with his wife and children in 1860.

The fully furnished house includes a courtyard garden, elegant carriageway, and slave quarters. The interior is restored and furnished in the style of the 1850s. The home boasts numerous technological and architectural advancements for its time, offering a glimpse into 19th-century cutting-edge design. It was declared a National Historic Landmark in 1974 for its association with Gallier, one of the city's most important architects of the mid-19th century.

In 1996, the Woman's Exchange became the steward of this historic house after acquiring it from Tulane University.  The Gallier House reflects an accurate and comprehensive historic restoration of one of New Orleans’ time-honored landmarks.

Architecture
The house is eclectic, combining Italianate features such as stucco treatment with classical elements like the formal front entrance. The stucco covering protected the soft, locally-made brick from erosion by wind and water. The building was constructed of brick-on-brick foundations which increase the width below the surface.

The front entry is protected by the original cast iron gate.  Much of the cast iron in the French Quarter was purchased from catalogs, so it was not as unique as the wrought iron.  The front gate of Gallier House, however, was designed by James Gallier Jr. specifically for this house.

Interior

See also
Hermann-Grima House, another French Quarter historic house museum operated by the Woman's Exchange
List of National Historic Landmarks in Louisiana
National Register of Historic Places listings in Orleans Parish, Louisiana

References

External links
 
 

National Historic Landmarks in Louisiana
French Quarter
Museums in New Orleans
Historic house museums in Louisiana
Houses completed in 1857
Houses in New Orleans
National Register of Historic Places in New Orleans
Historic district contributing properties in Louisiana
1860 establishments in Louisiana
Slave cabins and quarters in the United States
Woman's Exchange movement